Darjan Matović (born 12 October 1988) is a Bosnian football goalkeeper who plays for FK Proleter Teslić.

References

External links
 
 Darjan Matović Stats at utakmica.rs
 Stats for 2014/15 season at FSRS

1988 births
Living people
People from Foča
Association football goalkeepers
Serbian footballers
FK Javor Ivanjica players
FK Inđija players
FK Sutjeska Foča players
Serbian SuperLiga players
FK Proleter Teslić players